Mohamad Khodor Salem (born 2 February 1995) is a Lebanese footballer who plays as a midfielder for  club Nejmeh.

Club career 
Salem joined Nejmeh in the Lebanese Premier League on 29 July 2019, coming from Shabab Sahel. On 10 March 2020, Salem suffered an ACL injury; he underwent surgery on 7 May. On 12 July 2021, Salem scored a brace against Safa in the 2021 Lebanese Elite Cup group stage.

Personal life 
On 15 February 2021, Salem and his Nejmeh teammate Mahmoud Siblini were involved in a car crash on their way to training; they only suffered a few bruises.

Honours
Nejmeh
 Lebanese FA Cup: 2021–22; runner-up: 2020–21

References

External links
 
 
 
 

1995 births
Living people
People from Tyre District
Lebanese footballers
Association football midfielders
Shabab Al Sahel FC players
Akhaa Ahli Aley FC players
Nejmeh SC players
Lebanese Premier League players
Lebanese Second Division players
Lebanon youth international footballers
Lebanon international footballers